Dimick may refer to:

Horace Dimick, gunmaker and firearms dealer active in St. Louis, Missouri from 1849 through the early 1870s
Mary Lord Dimick (1858–1948), the second wife of the 23rd United States president Benjamin Harrison
Cecil I. and Mildred H. Dimick House at 575 West 800 North in Orem, Utah, United States, built in 1946
Dimick B. Huntington (1808–1879), leading Indian interpreter in early Utah Territory
Dimick Peaks, two peaks at the south side of the mouth of Dale Glacier in Victoria Land, Antarctica

See also
Dimmick